By All Means Necessary is the second album from American hip hop group Boogie Down Productions, released in April, 1988 on Jive Records. After the 1987 murder of DJ-producer Scott La Rock, MC KRS-One moved away from the violent themes that dominated Boogie Down Productions' debut, Criminal Minded, and began writing socially conscious songs using the moniker the Teacher.

Album information
Accompanied by minimalist production and hard-hitting drum beats, KRS-One covers social issues that include government and police corruption, safe sex, government involvement in the drug trade, and violence in the hip hop community.

The album's cover art and title both make reference to Malcolm X. The cover, depicting KRS-One, references an iconic photograph of Malcolm X peering through a window while holding an M1 carbine rifle, and the title is a modification of Malcolm X's famous phrase "by any means necessary".

As of September 25, 1989, the album was certified gold in sales by the Recording Industry Association of America.

Reception

The album is widely seen as one of, if not the first, politically conscious efforts in hip-hop. AllMusic critic Steve Huey described the album as a landmark of political hip hop. Anthony DeCurtis of Rolling Stone praised its social commentary and wrote, "Over irresistible beats provided by his BDP cohorts, KRS delivers the word on the drug trade, AIDS and violence—three forces that threaten to destroy minority communities."

In 1998, By All Means Necessary was included in The Sources "100 Best Albums" list.

In 2008, the single "My Philosophy" was ranked number 49 on VH1's 100 Greatest Songs of Hip Hop.

Track listing
All songs were written, produced and performed by KRS-One.

Samples used
"My Philosophy" contains a sample from the Stanley Turrentine song "Sister Sanctified".
"Ya Slippin'" contains an interpolation of the Deep Purple song "Smoke on the Water" and has the beat from "Poetry" from BDP's Criminal Minded.
"Stop the Violence" contains the riddim from the Courtney Melody recording "This Sound A Dem Trouble".
"Illegal Business" contains samples from the Fat Albert and the Cosby Kids recording "Creativity" and the Jefferson Starship recording "Rock Music".
"Nervous" contains samples from the Rhythm Heritage recording "Sky's the Limit" and the War recording "Galaxy".
"I'm Still #1" contains a sample from the All the People (featuring Robert Moore) recording "Cramp Your Style".
"Part-Time Suckers" contains samples from the Smokey Robinson & the Miracles recording "Mickey's Monkey" and interpolation from Stevie Wonder's hit song "Part-Time Lover".
"Jimmy" contains the basic rhythm from the Wings song "Let 'Em In" and a sample from the Sequence song "Funk You Up."

Charts
Album

Singles

Certifications

References

Boogie Down Productions albums
Jive Records albums
RCA Records albums
1988 albums
Albums produced by KRS-One